The Varvizel is a right tributary of the river Bistra in Romania. It flows into the Bistra in Popești.

References

Rivers of Romania
Rivers of Bihor County